is a Japanese freestyle wrestler who currently competes at 57 kilograms. In 2017, Takahashi became the World Champion and the Asian Champion, also medaling at both events in the next editions. He is currently expected to represent Japan at the 2020 Summer Olympics after claiming gold at the 2021 Asian Olympic Qualification Tournament.

References 

Wrestlers at the 2010 Summer Youth Olympics
Living people
1993 births
Wrestlers at the 2018 Asian Games
Medalists at the 2018 Asian Games
Asian Games medalists in wrestling
Asian Games bronze medalists for Japan
World Wrestling Championships medalists
Youth Olympic gold medalists for Japan
Asian Wrestling Championships medalists
Wrestlers at the 2020 Summer Olympics
Olympic wrestlers of Japan
21st-century Japanese people
World Wrestling Champions